Suffern is a village that was incorporated in 1796 in the town of Ramapo in Rockland County, New York. Suffern is located 31 miles northwest of Manhattan.  As of the 2010 census, Suffern's population was 10,723.

History

"The Point of the Mountains" or "Sidman's Clove" were names used before the American Revolution to designate the present village of Suffern. The area originally was inhabited by the Ramapough, a tribe of Munsee, who were a division of the Lenape tribe. Upon Sidman's death, this land passed into the hands of his son-in-law, John Smith, who sold it to John Suffern.

The village of Suffern was founded in 1796. John Suffern, first Rockland County judge, 1798–1806, settled near the base of the Ramapo Mountains in 1773, and called the place New Antrim, after his home in County Antrim, Northern Ireland. His French Huguenot ancestors had settled there after fleeing religious persecution in France. New Antrim's location was considered strategically important in the Revolutionary War because it was at an important crossroads near Ramapo Pass. General George Washington and other important military leaders used John Suffern's home as headquarters when they were in the area.

This history has been recognized by the town. Suffern is a stop on the Washington–Rochambeau Revolutionary Route National Historic Trail, under the auspices of the National Park Service.  This trail commemorates the route followed by General Washington and the French Comte de Rochambeau as they traveled to the siege of Yorktown, Virginia, which led to victory for the United States in gaining independence.

Rochambeau made encampment with his 5,000 soldiers in Suffern on August 25, 1781, on his way to Yorktown, and again on September 13, 1782, as he retraced his steps to New York.  An historical marker on the Washington Avenue side of the Lafayette Theatre identifies this site of "Rochambeau's Encampment 1781–1782". The National Park Service has installed a wayside panel near the gazebo in Suffern to commemorate Rochambeau's encampment in Suffern.  At the time of the encampment, this site was directly across the road from village founder John Suffern's home and tavern where the Count de Rochambeau stayed. Based on an 1860 painting of John Suffern's home that showed the well in the side yard, his home would have been in at the area of Licata Insurance.  The well is in the basement of the furniture store.

During the war, Commander-in-Chief General Washington and his regiment made camp in the village several times. Lafayette Avenue, the main street of Suffern, is named in honor of Revolutionary War hero Marie-Joseph Paul Yves Roch Gilbert du Motier, better known as the Marquis de Lafayette.

Other guests who took advantage of Suffern's hospitality included Lieutenant Colonel Aaron Burr, who later became the third Vice President of the United States; General George Clinton, who became the first (and longest-serving) elected Governor of New York, as well as the fourth Vice President of the United States (under both Thomas Jefferson and James Madison); and Alexander Hamilton, first United States Secretary of the Treasury under President Washington.

From Suffern to Monroe was a main route of travel through the western Hudson Highlands. The main road was the Albany Post Road, one of the oldest roads in the state, which served as the stagecoach line between Albany and New York City . Once the Hudson River froze in winter, the Post Road was heavily traveled as an alternate. The  of road through Ramapo Pass was later developed as the Orange Turnpike (now known as Route 17). Tolls were collected from 1800 until 1886 to maintain and improve the road. The New York State Thruway now runs through the pass. The south entrance to the town was garrisoned during the Revolution, with General Washington ordering as many as 400 soldiers to be stationed there at all times.

The first railroad line across Rockland County, the Erie Railroad, was built in 1841 and ran from Piermont to Ramapo. By 1851, the line was extended to Lake Erie, and was considered an engineering marvel. The tracks are now owned by the Norfolk Southern line. In consideration for the right-of-way given it by Judge Edward Suffern, son of founder John, to lay track across his  of land, the Erie Railroad named their depot "Suffern's Station." The village became known as Suffern, not New Antrim, as it had been called by John Suffern.

In 1897, Avon Products, known then as California Perfume Company, built a  laboratory in Suffern. By 1971 the lab had been expanded into the  Avon Suffern Research and Development facility. In late 2005, construction was finished on a state-of-the art,  facility that would become Avon's global hub for research and development. The new building was constructed on the same site as their previous R&D facility, which was demolished for site parking.

In 1916, what would become New York State Route 59, which reached from Nyack to Spring Valley in 1915, was extended to Suffern and Ramapo Hamlet.

In 1924, the Lafayette Theatre, named for the Revolutionary War hero the Marquis de Lafayette, opened its doors.

In 1972, the Salvation Army moved their School for Officer Training to a  site in Suffern. They took over the former Catholic School for Holy Children.

Geography

Suffern is designated as a gateway to the Hudson River Valley National Heritage Area.

Demographics

As of the census of 2000, there were 11,006 people, 4,634 households, and 2,836 families residing in the village. The population density was 5,265.8 people per square mile (2,033.2/km2). There were 4,762 housing units at an average density of 2,278.4 per square mile (879.7/km2). The racial makeup of the village was 86.83% white, 3.53% African American, 0.26% Native American, 2.83% Asian, 0.09% Pacific Islander, 4.52% from other races, and 1.94% from two or more races. Hispanic or Latino of any race were 12.87% of the population.

There were 4,634 households, out of which 25.2% had children under the age of 18 living with them, 47.6% were married couples living together, 10.2% had a female householder with no husband present, and 38.8% were non-families. 32.5% of all households were made up of individuals, and 12.2% had someone living alone who was 65 years of age or older. The average household size was 2.36 and the average family size was 3.00.

In the village, the population was spread out, with 20.1% under the age of 18, 7.4% from 18 to 24, 32.9% from 25 to 44, 24.7% from 45 to 64, and 14.9% who were 65 years of age or older. The median age was 39 years. For every 100 females, there were 92.1 males. For every 100 females age 18 and over, there were 89.7 males.

The median income for a household in the village was $59,754, and the median income for a family was $74,937. Males had a median income of $46,959 versus $36,093 for females. The per capita income for the village was $29,208. About 3.5% of families and 5.7% of the population were below the poverty line, including 7.6% of those under age 18 and 6.4% of those age 65 or over.

Economy 
Novartis had a manufacturing facility in Suffern, employing approximately 525 workers.  In January 2014, the company announced closure of this facility by 2017, citing loss of patent exclusivity on Diovan as a major factor in the decision.  The facility was engaged in the "production of tablets, capsules, vials and inhalation products".

Avon's Global Research and Development facility is located in Suffern, employing 350 scientists and technicians in developing cosmetics.

Arts and culture

Historical markers
 Rochambeau Encampment, Lafayette and Washington avenues
 Soldier's Monument, also known as Washington Ave. Monument, Washington and Lafayette avenues (NRHP)
 Suffern's Depot, 1 Erie Plaza
 Suffern Grammar School, 41 Wayne Avenue
 Suffern's Sacred Heart Parish, 129 Lafayette Avenue
 Suffern's Tavern Site, Washington and Lafayette avenues – Suffern's tavern sheltered many Continental Army officers, including Gen. Washington and Aaron Burr, commander of the troops guarding the Ramapo Pass. Torn down about 1856.

Landmarks and places of interest
 Brooklands Park – Lake Road – Site of Brooklands, home of Daniel Carter Beard, a founder of Boy Scouts of America.
 Hudson River Valley National Heritage Area – Suffern is a designated gateway to the HRVNHA.
 Lafayette Theatre – 97 Lafayette Avenue. Rockland's only surviving movie palace, opened in 1924, and having a renovated 1931 Wurlitzer pipe organ installed by the American Theatre Organ Society in 1992.
 Suffern Free Library – 210 Lafayette Avenue. The Ramapo Room contains historical books, clippings and photographs of western Ramapo.
 Suffern Railroad Museum – 1 Erie Plaza
 Suffern Village Museum – 61 Washington Avenue – Exhibits relating to the history of Suffern and the Ramapo area. Includes displays relating to American Indians, original Avon products, nearby iron mines, and Dan Beard, one of the founders of the Boy Scouts of America. Traveling Trunk program is available for classroom use.
 U.S. Post Office –  Built during the New Deal, is located on Chestnut Street between NY 59 and US 202, on the northern edge of the village's downtown business district. (NRHP)
 Washington Avenue Soldier's Monument and Triangle – Washington Avenue (NRHP) 
 Washington–Rochambeau Revolutionary Route Wayside Panel near gazebo

Government
Suffern's government is headed by a mayor, Michael Curley. The mayor presides over a village board consisting of four trustees. The village is represented in the United States House of Representatives by Mondaire Jones. In state government, it is represented by Senator Elijah Reichlin-Melnick and Assemblyman Mike Lawler. Suffern falls within the borders of the town of Ramapo, with Michael Specht serving as supervisor.

Education 
Suffern Middle School is the junior high school of the Suffern Central School District (SCSD), and is located in the village Montebello, adjacent to Suffern. The 1,200 grade 6-8 students educated there hail from Airmont, Suffern, Montebello, Hillburn, Sloatsburg and parts of Monsey.

The village is home to Richard P. Connor Elementary School, also part of SCSD. Viola Elementary School is located in the neighboring CDP of Viola. High school students are zoned to Suffern High School.

In 2013, Cherry Lane Elementary School, located in the neighboring Village of Airmont and part of SCSD, became one of the Blue Ribbon School of Excellence Award winners awarded by the U.S. Department of Education.

Rockland Community College, part of the SUNY system, is located just outside the village limits.

Media
 The Irishman was filmed in Suffern.
 Parts of Manifest were filmed near Soldier's Monument and the Lafayette Theatre.
 Suffern was the fictional setting for Aidan's country house in the HBO TV Show Sex And The City, Season 4, Episode 57, "Sex and the Country"

Infrastructure

Transportation
Suffern station serves both local and express trains, operated by New Jersey Transit to Hoboken Terminal with connecting service at Secaucus Junction to New York's Pennsylvania Station. Most New Jersey Transit Main Line trains terminate at Suffern; some Bergen County Line trains also terminate at Suffern; and Metro-North Railroad's Port Jervis Line trains continue into Orange County to Port Jervis. Transport of Rockland buses serve Suffern, as do the Bergen County routes of Coach USA ShortLine.

U.S. Route 202, New York State Route 59, Interstate 287, and Interstate 87, also known as the New York State Thruway, go through Suffern.

Notable people

 Nicholas Allard (born 1952), dean and president of Brooklyn Law School
 Christine Andreas (born 1951), singer and two-time Tony-nominated Broadway actress; credits include My Fair Lady, Oklahoma!, and On Your Toes
 Dave Annable (born 1979), actor, best known for playing the role of Justin Walker in ABC's Brothers & Sisters
 Daniel Carter Beard (1850–1941), a founder of Boy Scouts of America
 Jay Beckenstein, of jazz fusion group Spyro Gyra, built his recording studio, BearTracks Studios, in Suffern
 Christina Bianco, actress and viral video star
 Mike Bodker, mayor of Johns Creek, Georgia 
 Ralph Borsodi, economist and social critic who moved to Suffern in 1920 and eventually founded the School of Living nearby
 Keith Bulluck, former NFL Pro Bowl middle linebacker 
 Chris Caffery, guitarist for Savatage and Trans-Siberian Orchestra, now solo artist
 Otis H. Cutler (1866–1922), businessman and politician
 Will Cunnane, MLB pitcher for the Atlanta Braves, San Diego Padres, Milwaukee Brewers, and Chicago Cubs
 Tim Daly, actor, best known for TV sitcom Wings and TV drama Private Practice
 Tyne Daly, actress, best known for TV dramas Cagney & Lacey and Judging Amy
 Peter Daszak, British zoologist
 Tony DeFrancesco, former MLB interim manager with the Houston Astros
 Ryan Grant, former NFL running back 
 Dan Gurewitch, comedy writer and actor, best known for CollegeHumor
 Valerie Harper, actress, best known for her role as Rhoda Morgenstern on The Mary Tyler Moore Show and its spin-off Rhoda
 Alexander D. Henderson, one of the founders of the California Perfume Company, which later became Avon Products
 Pat Hingle (1924–2009), actor
 Joe Lockhart, White House press secretary under President Bill Clinton
 Thomas Meehan, Tony Award-winning author of Annie and The Producers
 Jean Muir, actress
 Tommy Murphy, Major League Baseball player
 C.J. Nitkowski, left-handed pitcher who played for 10 Major League Baseball clubs
 Michelle Pantoliano, anchor for Naked News
 Carole Radziwill, author, journalist, and star of Real Housewives of New York City
 Ida Mary Barry Ryan (1854-1917), philanthropist
 Margaret Salmon, award-winning filmmaker artist
 Claudio Sanchez, graphic novelist and lead singer-guitarist for Coheed and Cambria
 Marty Springstead (1937–2012), American League baseball umpire
 Grace VanderWaal (born 2004), 2016 winner of America's Got Talent
 Walt Weiss (born 1963), MLB shortstop, 1988 AL Rookie of the Year, and former manager of the Colorado Rockies

References

External links

 
 Historical Markers and War Memorials in Suffern, New York

1796 establishments in New York (state)
History of New York (state)
Populated places established in 1796
Ramapos
Villages in New York (state)
Villages in Rockland County, New York